The 2007–08 La Liga season, the 77th since its establishment, started on 25 August 2007 and finished on 18 May 2008. Real Madrid defended their La Liga title successfully after a 2–1 victory over Osasuna. This season, all European leagues ended earlier than the previous season, due to the UEFA Euro 2008 championship. It also was the first year of the new La Liga television agreement that had La Sexta mark its first year of television broadcasting.

Teams 
Twenty teams competed in the league – the top seventeen teams from the previous season and the three teams promoted from the Segunda División. The promoted teams were Valladolid, Almería and Murcia. Valladolid and Murcia returned to the top flight after an absence of three years while UD Almería were promoted for the first time. However, since AD Almería played in the 1980–81 La Liga, the city of Almería returned to the top fight after an absence of twenty six years. They replaced Celta de Vigo, Real Sociedad and Gimnàstic, ending their top flight spells of two, forty and one year respectively.

Team information

Stadia and locations 

(*) Promoted from Segunda División.

League table

Results

Awards

Pichichi Trophy 
The Pichichi Trophy is awarded to the player who scores the most goals in a season.

Zamora Trophy 
The Zamora Trophy is awarded to the goalkeeper with least goals to games ratio.

Fair Play award 

 Source: 2007–08 Fair Play Rankings Season.

Pedro Zaballa award 
Spain supporters

Season statistics

Scoring 
 First goal of the season: Sergio Agüero for Atlético Madrid against Real Madrid (25 August 2007)
 Fastest goal in a match: 7 seconds – Joseba Llorente for Valladolid against Espanyol (20 January 2008)
 Goal scored at the latest point in a match: 90+4 minutes
 Manu for Getafe against Recreativo (2 September 2007)
 Euzebiusz Smolarek for Racing Santander against Recreativo (23 March 2008)
 Roberto Ayala for Zaragoza against Deportivo (3 May 2008)
 Widest winning margin: 7 – Real Madrid 7–0 Valladolid (10 February 2008)
 Most goals in a match: 9 – Atlético Madrid 6–3 Almería (6 April 2008)
 First own goal of the season: Daniel Jarque for Sevilla against Espanyol (25 September 2007)
 First hat-trick of the season:
  Thierry Henry for Barcelona against Levante (29 September 2007)
 Most goals in a match by one player: 3 goals
 Hat-tricks of the season:
  Thierry Henry for Barcelona against Levante (29 September 2007)
  Christian Riganò for Levante against Almería (4 November 2007)
  Joseba Llorente for Valladolid against Recreativo (13 January 2008)
  Samuel Eto'o for Barcelona against Levante (24 February 2008)
  Juan Arango for Mallorca against Recreativo (9 March 2008)
  Xisco for Deportivo against Murcia (30 March 2008)
  Daniel Güiza for Mallorca against Murcia (20 April 2008)
  David Villa for Valencia against Levante (11 May 2008)
  Giovani dos Santos for Barcelona against Murcia (17 May 2008)
 Most goals by one team in a match: 7 Goals
 Real Madrid 7–0 Valladolid (10 February 2008)
 Mallorca 7–1 Recreativo (9 March 2008)
 Most goals in one half by one team: 5
 Real Madrid 7–0 Valladolid (10 February 2008)
 Mallorca 7–1 Recreativo (9 March 2008)
 Most goals scored by losing team: 3 Goals
 Atlético Madrid 4–3 Sevilla (31 October 2007)
 Atlético Madrid 3–4 Villarreal (4 November 2007)
 Real Madrid 4–3 Mallorca (11 November 2007)
 Atlético Madrid 4–3 Valladolid (25 November 2007)
 Levante 4–3 Betis (25 November 2007)
 Villarreal 4–3 Deportivo (13 January 2008)
 Atlético Madrid 6–3 Almería (6 April 2008)
 Murcia 3–5 Barcelona (17 May 2008)

Cards 
 First yellow card: Luis Perea for Atlético Madrid against Real Madrid (25 August 2007)
 First red card: David Cortés for Getafe against Sevilla (25 August 2007)

Average home attendance 
 Highest average home attendance: 76,234 (Real Madrid)
 Lowest average home attendance: 10,658 (Getafe)

Clean sheets 
 Most clean sheets – Villarreal (17)
 Fewest clean sheets – Levante (4)

Overall 
 Most wins – Real Madrid (27)
 Fewest wins – Murcia and Levante (7)
 Most draws – Mallorca (14)
 Fewest draws – Real Madrid and Sevilla (4)
 Most losses – Levante (26)
 Fewest losses – Real Madrid (7)
 Most goals scored – Real Madrid (84)
 Fewest goals scored – Levante (33)
 Most goals conceded – Levante (75)
 Fewest goals conceded – Real Madrid (36)

Home 
 Most wins – Real Madrid (17)
 Fewest wins – Levante (5)
 Most draws – Valladolid (9)
 Fewest draws – Real Madrid (0)
 Most losses – Levante (10)
 Fewest losses – Real Madrid and Villarreal(2)
 Most goals scored – Real Madrid (53)
 Fewest goals scored – Almería (18)
 Most goals conceded – Levante (34)
 Fewest goals conceded – Barcelona (12)

Away 
 Most wins – Villarreal(12)
 Fewest wins – Murcia and Zaragoza (1)
 Most draws – Mallorca and Barcelona (8)
 Fewest draws – Villarreal (0)
 Most losses – Levante (16)
 Fewest losses – Real Madrid and Mallorca (5)
 Most goals scored – Mallorca (34)
 Fewest goals scored – Levante (11)
 Most goals conceded – Levante (41)
 Fewest goals conceded – Real Madrid (18)

See also 
 List of transfers of La Liga – 2007–08 season
 2007–08 Segunda División
 2007–08 Copa del Rey
 Antonio Puerta

References

External links 

 
2007 2008
1